Cogia cajeta, the yellow-haired skipper, is a species of butterfly of the family Hesperiidae. Subspecies cajeta is found in Mexico in southern Veracruz, eastern Oaxaca, Tabasco and north-eastern Chiapas. Subspecies eluina is found from Jalisco and the Yucatan Peninsula south to Costa Rica.

Subspecies
Cogia cajeta cajeta (Mexico)
Cogia cajeta eluina (Mexico, Guatemala, Nicaragua)

External links
Mexican Butterflies
Taxon Notes on Neotropical Skippers

Eudaminae
Taxa named by Gottlieb August Wilhelm Herrich-Schäffer
Butterflies described in 1869
Butterflies of North America
Butterflies of Central America